Gliese 3293 is a star in the constellation of Eridanus, that is orbited by four planets, two of which (Gliese 3293b/Gliese 3293d) are located within the star's habitable zone. It is located at the celestial coordinates: Right Ascension , Declination . With an apparent visual magnitude of 11.96, this star is too faint to be seen with the naked eye. It can be viewed with a telescope having an aperture of at least . Gliese 3293 is significantly smaller and cooler than the Sun.

Planetary system
In 2015, it was discovered that Gliese 3293 possessed two planets, and in 2017 an additional two planets were discovered, making a total of four. Two of these planets are located within the habitable zone: Gliese 3293b and Gliese 3293d.

References

M-type main-sequence stars
Planetary transit variables
3293
J04283571-2510088
Planetary systems with four confirmed planets
Eridanus (constellation)